A Master of Men is a 1918 British silent film directed by Wilfred Noy and starring Malcolm Keen,  Dorothy Bellew and Marie Hemingway.

Cast
 Malcolm Keen as Enoch Strone  
 Dorothy Bellew as Milly Wilson  
 Marie Hemingway as Lady Malingcourt  
 Sydney Lewis Ransome as Reverend Martin  
 Jeff Barlow as Dobell

References

Bibliography
 Low, Rachael. History of the British Film, 1914-1918. Routledge, 2005.

External links

1918 films
1918 drama films
British drama films
Films directed by Wilfred Noy
British silent feature films
Films based on British novels
British black-and-white films
1910s English-language films
1910s British films
Silent drama films